Male Bonding is an English indie/noise rock band.  The group released their debut album, Nothing Hurts, on 11 May 2010.

History
Based in London, England Male Bonding is composed of John Arthur Webb (vocals, guitar), Kevin Hendrick (vocals, bass) and Robin Silas Christian (drums). Webb and Hendrick formerly played together in the noise rock band Pre and met Christian whilst working in a record shop. Their first show was at a house party called "RAGE!" in May 2008. The band shared several releases before signing to the Sub Pop label in July 2009. Their first release for the label was a split 7-inch single with Dum Dum Girls titled "Pay for Me / Before It's Gone" and released on Record Store Day 2010.

Their first full-length album, Nothing Hurts, received generally positive reviews from several music sites, including The Guardian, and Pitchfork Media who placed it in their 'Best New Music' category.  Brooklyn band Vivian Girls appear on the track "Worse to Come". In 2011, it was chosen for the shortlist of The Guardian's First Album awards.

During 2010 the band collaborated on a song with Rivers Cuomo.

Discography

Albums and EPs
 Nothing Hurts (Sub Pop, 2010)
 Covers EP (Self released, 2010)
 Nothing Remains EP (Paradise Vendors Inc / Sub Pop, 2010)
 Endless Now (Sub Pop, 2011)
 Headache (Self released, 2016)

Singles
 Male Bonding / Graffiti Island / PENS (Italian Beach Babes, 2008)
 Male Bonding / PENS (Paradise Vendors Inc, 2009)
 Male Bonding / Graffiti Island / Old Blood / Rapid Youth (Paradise Vendors Inc, 2009)
 Male Bonding / Eat Skull (Tough Love Records, 2009)
 Male Bonding / Cold Pumas (Faux Discx, 2009)
 Male Bonding / Fair Ohs / Graffiti Island / PENS - "Violent and Obscene" - a tribute to GG Allin (Italian Beach Babes, 2009)
 Male Bonding / Meth Teeth / Mazes (Split Tapes, 2009)
 Male Bonding / Fair Ohs - "Live in London 02.10.09" - (Italian Beach Babes, 2009)
 "Daytrotter" (Sub Pop, 2010)
 Dum Dum Girls / Male Bonding - "Pay for Me" / "Before it's Gone" (Sub Pop, 2010)
 EMA / Male Bonding -   (For Us, 2012)

Compilations
 Rough Trade Counter Culture 09 (Rough Trade, 2009)
 PVI004 / IBB006 (Paradise Vendors Inc / Italian Beach Babes, 2009)
 Tease Torment Tantalize: A 30th Anniversary Tribute to the Smiths' Debut (Reimagine Music, 2015)

References

External links 
 Male Bonding at BandCamp
 Sub Pop band page
 Interview with Robin Silas Christian, September 2010

British indie rock groups
British noise rock groups
Sub Pop artists
Noise pop musical groups
Underground punk scene in the United Kingdom